Narayankhed is a town and revenue division in Sangareddy district of the Indian state of Telangana.

Demographics 
As of 2011 Indian Census, Narayankhed census town had a total population of 15,610, of which 7,963 were males and 7,647 were females. Population within the age group of 0 to 6 years was 2,069. The total number of literates in Narayankhed was 10,198, which constituted 65.3% of the population with male literacy of 72.4% and female literacy of 57.9%. The effective literacy rate of 7+ population of Narayankhed was 75.3%, of which male literacy rate was 83.7% and female literacy rate was 66.6%. The Scheduled Castes and Scheduled Tribes population was 1,136 and 247 respectively. Narayankhed had 3014 households in 2011.

Administration

Revenue villages in the Mandal 
 Hungarga (K)
 Chaptakhadim
 Ryakal
 Kanjipur
 Sanjeevanrao pet
 Ryalamadugu
 Nizampet
 Namalimet
 Narasapur
 Kondapur
 Chandkhanpally
 Gangapur
 Nagpur
 Allapur
 Hungarga (b)
Abbenda
 Gadtihokrana
 Mansoorpur
 Narayankhed
 Venkatapur
 Hanmantraupet
 Madhavar
 Lingapur
 Jukkal
 Chandapur
 Antwar
 Bhanapur
 Jujalpur
 Jagannathpur
 Pipri
 Panchgaon
 Paidpally
 Satgaon
 Anantasagar
 Rudrar

Nearby Mandal's 
South: Manoor, East: Regode , Sankarampet (a) Alladurg

References 

Cities and towns in Sangareddy district